State Route 35 (SR 35) is a primary state highway in the U.S. state of Virginia.  The state highway runs  from the North Carolina state line near Boykins, where the highway continues as North Carolina Highway 35 (NC 35), north to SR 605 and SR 622 in Templeton.  SR 35 is the main north–south highway of Southampton County; the highway also connects U.S. Route 58 (US 58) in Courtland with Interstate 95 (I-95) and US 301 at Templeton south of Petersburg.

Route description

SR 35 begins at the North Carolina state line south of Boykins.  The highway continues south as NC 35, which crosses the Meherrin River a short distance to the south.  SR 35 heads north as Meherrin Road, which parallels the North Carolina and Virginia Railroad to the town of Boykins.  The state highway follows Main Street through town and meets the eastern end of SR 186 (Beaton Avenue).  SR 35 intersects CSX's Portsmouth Subdivision and continues northeast as Meherrin Road.  Next to Southampton High School, the state highway meets US 58 (Southampton Parkway) at a diamond interchange.  SR 35 runs concurrently with US 58 Business northeast on a through truss bridge over the Nottoway River into the town of Courtland.  In the center of the county seat, US 58 Business turns south onto Main Street and SR 35 heads north and meets Norfolk Southern Railway's Franklin District at grade.

SR 35 heads northwest from Courtland as Plank Road.  The state highway crosses over then parallels the Assamoosick Swamp north into Sussex County.  Within that county, SR 35 is named Jerusalem Plank Road (see Battle of Jerusalem Plank Road) and intersects SR 40 (Sussex Drive) in the hamlet of Homeville.  The state highway continues into Prince George County as Courtland Road to the village of Templeton.  SR 35 meets US 301 (Crater Road) just east of I-95; the intersection also serves as the southern terminus of SR 156 (Prince George Drive) and receives the exit ramp from northbound I-95.  SR 35 and US 301 head west across I-95 and meet the other three ramps of the partial cloverleaf interchange with the Interstate.  US 301 turns south onto Crater Road while the state highway continues to its terminus at the intersection of SR 605 (Spain Drive) and SR 622 (Providence Road).

Major intersections

References

External links

Virginia Highways Project: VA 35

035
State Route 035
State Route 035
State Route 035